Xaa-Pro dipeptidase (prolidase, imidodipeptidase, proline dipeptidase, peptidase D, gamma-peptidase) is an enzyme. This enzyme catalyses the following chemical reaction

 Hydrolysis of Xaa!Pro dipeptides; also acts on aminoacyl-hydroxyproline analogs

This enzyme is Mn2+-activated.

References

External links 
 

EC 3.4.13